Makoma is a Christian, pop, R&B and dance musical group originating from Kinshasa, Democratic Republic of Congo (formerly Zaire) and established in the Netherlands. It is made up of 6 siblings (3 brothers and 3 sisters): Nathalie Makoma, Annie Makoma, Pengani Makoma, Tutala Makoma, Duma Makoma, Martin Makoma and a non-family member, Patrick Badine. They mainly sing in Lingala and in French, Dutch and German.

The singer Nathalie Makoma left the group in 2004 and has her solo career after ending as runner-up during the Dutch Idols 4 in 2007-2008. In the final she sang with her brothers and sisters "Ola Olé", a definitive hit of the Makoma band.

Makoma were back with a new album in 2012 called Evolution containing 10 new songs. The lineup is the same, except for Nathalie Makoma who decided starting 2006 to concentrate on her own solo career.

Career
The group Makoma was established by Tutala Makoma in 1993, and started performing in public as a group in 1995. The name of the band was "Nouveau Testament" (translated as New Testament").

The family left Democratic Republic of Congo formerly known as Zaire because of political strife and established in the Netherlands, later in Germany to return in 1996 to reside in Rotterdam, the Netherlands. The band was renamed Makoma (the name of the family) after establishing in Europe. They record at the Westcoast Studios, also owned by Tutala Makoma in Rotterdam. Annie Makoma designs most of the group's stage attire, and Martin Makoma doubles up as the group's choreographer. 

Their debut album was released in 2000 entitled Nzambe Na Bomoyi followed in 2002 entitled On Faith. The same year they won the Best African Group at the Kora African Music Awards. They have toured many countries including many European countries, Africa, the Caribbean and Canada.

Nathalie Makoma, born on 24 February 1982 in Kinshasa became, a well-known Dutch-Congolese singer in her own right, . Nathalie Makoma left the band and established in England and later in Ireland. She released On Faith in 2003 and I Saw the Light in 2005. In 2007-2008, she returned to the Netherlands and participated in Idols 4 in the Netherlands and finished runner-up, with the title going to Nikki Kerkhof. The group Makoma made a guest appearance on the Idols final with their sister Nathalie singing Ola Olé in English with her. She is signed to Sony BMG.

Awards
2002: Best African Group at the Kora Awards
2005: Best Group South Pacific Award

Discography

Albums
1999: Nzambe na Bomoyi (Jesus For Life)
Tracks:
Napesi
Butu Na Moyi
Mwinda
Moto Oyo
Natamboli
Nzambe Na Bomoyi

2002: Mokonzi na Bakonzi (King of Kings)
Tracks:
Mokonzi Na Bakonzi
Nasengi
Bana
Naleli
Nzambe Na Ngai
Tolingana

2005: Na Nzambe Te, Na Bomoyi Te (also known as No Jesus, No Life)
Tracks:
Nakobina
Ola Olé
Yo Wuti
Asala
Ezali Mawa
No Jesus, No Life
Bolingo
Tolingana

2012: Evolution 
Tracks:
Evolution
Alingi Biso
Yo Ozali
Ndeko
Mokonzi
Se Ye
Maboko Likolo
Mokili
Sosola
Nguya Na Ye

See also
Nathalie Makoma

References

External links
Makoma Makoma official website

Dutch musical groups
Democratic Republic of the Congo musicians
People from Kinshasa
Christian pop groups